The Free routine combination competition of the synchronised swimming events at the 2015 World Aquatics Championships was held on 26 July and 1 August 2015.

==Results==
The preliminary round was held on 26 July at 14:00. The final was held on 1 August at 17:30.

Green denotes finalists

References

Free routine combination